Graeme "Jerker" Jenkin (born 5 September 1945) is a former Australian rules footballer who played with Collingwood and Essendon in the VFL during the 1960s and 1970s.

Jenkin is best remembered for being the player that Carlton's Alex Jesaulenko took a spectacular mark over in the 1970 Grand Final, prompting the famous call of "Oh, Jesaulenko, you beauty!" by commentator Mike Williamson. 

A ruckman, Jenkin first appeared for Collingwood in the 1963 season and, after managing just three games that year, missed all of 1965 with a broken leg. He returned in 1966 but couldn't break into their finals side, and, with first-choice ruckman Ray Gabelich retiring that year, he looked like getting more regular game time. However, the emergence of Len Thompson again relegated him to secondary ruckman, but he played full seasons in 1970 and 1971.

In 1974, he was traded to Essendon in a swap for John Williams but struggled in his time there with injury. In July 1976, he transferred to Brunswick in the Victorian Football Association.

He is the subject of a song by the Melbourne group TISM titled "The Back Upon Which Jezza Jumped", included on the album Gentlemen, Start Your Egos.

References

Holmesby, Russell and Main, Jim (2007). The Encyclopedia of AFL Footballers. 7th ed. Melbourne: Bas Publishing.

External links

1945 births
Australian rules footballers from Victoria (Australia)
Brunswick Football Club players
Collingwood Football Club players
Essendon Football Club players
Living people